Capitol Street can refer to three separate streets in Washington, D.C, United States:

East Capitol Street
South Capitol Street
North Capitol Street

Odonyms referring to a building